Bayanchandmani is a sum of Töv Province in Mongolia.  It lies on the main road going west and then north from the national capital.

In 2011, the population was 3,783.

References

Districts of Töv Province